The Model Technical Higher Secondary Schools are a set of secondary schools located in Kerala, India. These schools were established as part of the growth in the technology and hi-tech sectors and as a means of providing education in these areas. These schools are managed by the Institute of Human Resources Development (IHRD) and promote scientific advancement, technological progress, and economic growth. The instruction is conducted in English.

List of MTHSS Institutions
Technical Higher Secondary School, Adoor
Technical Higher Secondary School, Aluva
Technical Higher Secondary School, Aranmula
Technical Higher Secondary School, Attingal
Technical Higher Secondary School, Chettuva
Model Technical Higher Secondary School, Kaloor
Model Technical Higher Secondary School, Kaprassery
Technical Higher Secondary School, Koduvally
Technical Higher Secondary School, Kudappanakunnu
Technical Higher Secondary School, Mallappally
Technical Higher Secondary School, Muthuvallur
Technical Higher Secondary School, Muttom
Technical Higher Secondary School, Perissery
Technical Higher Secondary School, Perithalmanna
Technical Higher Secondary School, Perumade
Technical Higher Secondary School, Puthuppally
Technical Higher Secondary School, Varadium
Technical Higher Secondary School, Vattamkulam
Technical Higher Secondary School, Vazhakkad

External links
 Institute of Human Resources Development
 Dept. of Higher Secondary Education, Kerala

High schools and secondary schools in Kochi